was a Japanese track and field athlete. He competed in the men's discus throw at the 1964 Summer Olympics.

References

1937 births
2006 deaths
Place of birth missing
Japanese male discus throwers
Olympic male discus throwers
Olympic athletes of Japan
Athletes (track and field) at the 1964 Summer Olympics
Asian Games bronze medalists for Japan
Asian Games medalists in athletics (track and field)
Athletes (track and field) at the 1962 Asian Games
Medalists at the 1962 Asian Games
Japan Championships in Athletics winners
20th-century Japanese people
21st-century Japanese people